A sabkha is a coastal, supratidal mudflat or sandflat in which evaporite-saline minerals accumulate as the result of semiarid to arid climate. Sabkhas are gradational between land and intertidal zone within restricted coastal plains just above normal high-tide level. Within a sabkha, evaporite-saline minerals sediments typically accumulate below the surface of mudflats or sandflats. Evaporite-saline minerals, tidal-flood, and aeolian deposits characterize many sabkhas found along modern coastlines. The accepted type locality for a sabkha is at the southern coast of the Persian Gulf, in the United Arab Emirates. Sabkha is a phonetic transliteration of the Arabic word used to describe any form of salt flat. A sabkha is also known as a sabkhah, sebkha, or coastal sabkha.

The term sabkha has also been used as a general term for any flat area, coastal or interior, where, as the result of evaporation, salt and other evaporite minerals precipitate near or at the surface. The term continental sabkha is used for such environments found within deserts. Because of the confusion created by using sabkha for salt flats and playas, it has been proposed that the usage of this term be abandoned for playas and other intracontinental basins and flats.

Origin and development

The Abu Dhabi Sabkha 
The origin and progression of coastal sabkha development at the southern shore of the Persian Gulf was first discussed in detail in the seminal paper by Evans et al. 1969. The southern shoreline of the Persian Gulf is a shallow, low-angle carbonate ramp characterised by an evaporitic supratidal system passing offshore, via a broad carbonate–evaporite intertidal environment, into a carbonate-dominated subtidal system. 
This is a low-energy setting with a small tidal  range (1–2 m) and low wave energy as a result of the limited fetch. High rates of evaporation result in salinities of 45–46 g l−1 along the open-marine coast of Abu Dhabi and up to 89 g l−1 in more-restricted lagoons. The coast of Abu Dhabi is locally protected from open-marine conditions by a number of peninsulas and offshore shoals and islands associated with the east–west trending Great Pearl Bank.

Khor lagoon
In the khor-lagoon-sabkha model, an initial rise in sea-level floods coastal areas and creates shallow water features. If the features silt up, or the land rises, or the sea level falls, then the trapped water evaporates, leaving a flat salt pan, or sabkha. If the coastal region has irregular topography, then the flooding creates large independent creeks, or khors. A khor is a shallow, subtidal flat or tidal inlet. The inlet may host grey mangroves, depending on whether less saline water is available from wadis or groundwater. As sediment begins to accumulate, the khors become more shallow and form a lagoon, or intertidal flat. The lagoons continue to fill until the lagoon floor is exposed at low tide, and the sabkha begins to form. A sabkha may be inundated during higher than normal spring tides, after rainstorms, or when driving winds push seawater onshore to a depth of a few centimeters. Mature sabkhas are only flooded after heavy rainstorms and may eventually coalesce to form a sabkha coastal plain. These coastal plains are very flat, with reliefs between 10–50 cm, and their seaward slope can be as little as 1:1,000.

These environments can be found laterally contemporaneous in parallel belts to the coast as well. Coral reefs, barrier islands, and oolite shoals form the barrier with the open shelf. These types of deposits are indicative of higher energy and protect the khor-lagoon environments, allowing for the growth of mangrove swamps and algal and cyano-bacterial mats that prefer the more closed, lower energy environment. Inland of this are the supratidal sabkhas. The sabkhas can be as wide as 15 km when seaward of dune fields supplying large amounts of sediment. Sabkhas seaward of low outcrops of Miocene carbonate-evaporites or alluvial fans off the Oman fold and thrust belt can be as narrow as several hundred meters.

Dune field
If the coast has dune fields, then flooding creates many smaller pools between the crests of the dunes. In some parts of the world, these lakes can also form in inland deserts, filled by rain or a rising water table from underground aquifers.

For example, large parts of the Empty Quarter in Saudi Arabia and the southern UAE consist of patterns of high drifting barchan dunes alternating with continental sabkha filled with salt flats. In some places, the continental sabkha connect to form long accessible corridors into the desert.

The third picture shows the area south of the crescent-shaped Liwa Oasis in the southern UAE. The picture is about 80km wide, with each continental sabkha about 2-3 km long and 1 km wide. You can see white deposits of salt covering the surface of the continental sabkha. The Moreeb Dune, rising 120 m above the continental sabkha, is located roughly in the middle of the picture. The border between Saudi Arabia and the UAE is shown in red.

The floor of a continental sabkha is usually a hard-packed combination of sand, mud and salt. It is easy to walk or drive 4x4 vehicles across the dry, continental sabkha. However, after rains and flash-floods, the continental sabkha fill with shallow layers of water, and cannot be crossed until they dry out to form a new crust. When the ground is partly dried, a salt crust forms over soft mud or hollow cavities, and a vehicle will become stuck after breaking through the crust.

Here are two current examples of dune fields being flooded. The first is not a desert, but a coastal dune field in the Amazon region, flooded by heavy rains. The second is a dry inland desert in the Gobi region, flooded by ground water from nearby mountains.

Climate effects
The climate is one of the main factors in sabkha development. Rainfall in this arid region usually occurs as thunderstorms and averages 4 cm/year. Temperatures can range in excess of 50 °C to as low as 0 °C. Humidity is linked to the wind direction, with humidity as low as 20% in the mornings from off the dry interior and building in the afternoon as a strong, onshore wind prevail. At night, relative humidity of 100% can lead to dense fogs.  Water temperatures vary by depth with shallow water as much as 10 °C warmer. These high temperatures drive high rates of evaporation in the Persian Gulf, as much as 124 cm/year leading salinity to increase in the shallow lagoons to as much as 70 ppt. The net rate of evaporation from the sabkha can be as much as an order of magnitude less and has averaged 6 cm for the last 4,000 to 5,000 years. The reasons for this are that the sabkha surface is not a free-water surface, the high humidity during the night, and vertical stratification of the air column. Despite the loss of water due to evaporation, the groundwater, never deeper than 1.5 m, flows seawards and is recharged by continental waters, rainstorms, and the northwest "shamal” gale-force winds that create waves of greater height than the intertidal height and drive water as much as 5 km inland over the sabkha to a depth of a few centimeters.
 
The climate variations lead to the very dynamic nature of a sabkha. Halite is deposited on the surface of the sabkha and gypsum and aragonite precipitate in the subsurface via capillary action from brines brought up from the water table. In drier parts of the sabkha the gypsum can be altered to anhydrite and the aragonite can be dolomitized diagenetically. Thermal contraction at night and expansion during the day leads to concave polygonal pans as the edges have been upturned, in part due to growth of evaporites wedging the crack apart. Below this is a gypsum mush where nodules of anhydrite and other sulfates may develop. These might also form a “chicken wire” crystalline structure. Below this are the intertidal deposits typified by laminated, organic-rich muds formed by the microbial mats that grade downward into more bioturbated muds. The subtidal facies show carbonate grainstones and lagoonal muds.

These facies sequences, except for the halite that is frequently re-dissolved when wetted, can easily be preserved. Factors enabling preservation include the progradation of the sabkha with sedimentation rates of 1 m/1000 years and the creation of Stokes surfaces. These surfaces are created by the deflation of the sabkha surface that is related to the level of the groundwater table acting as a local base level.

Hydrocarbon reservoirs
Sabkha deposits are believed to form some of the major subsurface hydrocarbon reservoirs in the Middle East (and elsewhere). The source of these hydrocarbons (both gas and oil) may be the microbial mats and mangrove paleosoils, found in the sabkha sequence, that have total organic carbon up to 8.2% and hydrogen indices typical of marine type II kerogens.

Some ancient analogs include immediate subsurface formations such as the Permian Khuff Formation, Jurassic Arab and Hith anhydrites, and Tertiary sedimentary rocks. Similar deposits are also found in the Ordovician Williston Basin, the Permian Basin in Texas, as well as the Jurassic Gulf of Mexico. Modern sabkhas are present in varying form along the coasts of North Africa,  Baja California, and at Shark Bay in Australia.

See also

References

External links
Sebkhat El Melah, Tunisia, from NASA's Earth Observatory

Salt flats
Geological processes
Geography of the United Arab Emirates